is a Japanese music composer, arranger and conductor. He studied at the Kunitachi College of Music in Tokyo and completed master's degree in 1982.

Biography
He graduated from Akita Minami High School and went on to study at Kunitachi College of Music, where he began a wide range of activities from classical and contemporary music to jazz, rock, folk music and songs. In 1980, he graduated first in his class in composition and was awarded the Takeoka Prize for excellence.
After graduation, he went to Australia and became the first Japanese to master the Fairlight CMI (Computer Musical Instrument) and one of the founders of computer music in Japan. Since then, he has created music for many artists' albums, films, animations, videos, and many commercials and TV programs.
His orchestral works include the musical scores of Battle Royale, Giant Robo and Stratos 4. The films and TV series featuring his music are genres action, science fiction, Hentai, and horror. Amano's orchestra of choice is Poland's Warsaw Philharmonic Orchestra (and its associated choir).

After presenting his own compositions at the Tokyo Music Festival World Convention in 1983 and 1984, and at a special guest performance in 1988, he has served as musical director and conductor for numerous events.

He has composed many pieces for wind ensemble that are recorded by the Tokyo Kosei Wind Orchestra and regularly performed by bands at the All-Japan Band Association competitions. since 2015, he has been arranging and conducting New Sounds in Brass, succeeding the late Naohiro Iwai.

In 2017, the 60th Anniversary Concert Tour of Masamichi Amano was held throughout Japan (Akita, Tokyo, Kawasaki, Fukuoka, Kawagoe).
He received the 23rd (2000) and 24th (2001) Japan Academy Prize for Excellence in Music. He received the 10th (2000) Academy Award of the Japan Band Association in the Composition and Arrangement Division.

He is a regular member of the Japan Music Rights Association (JASRAC), a member of the International Society for Contemporary Music (ISCM), a member of the 21st Century Windband "Kyoen", a special lecturer at Shobi Music College, and a visiting professor at Tokyo College of Music.

Compositions

Symphonies 
 Symphony No. 1 "Graal" for Wind Orchestra
 Symphony No. 2 "Giant Robo: The Day the Earth Stood Still"
 Symphony No. 3 "GR: Giant Robo"
 Symphony No. 4 for Chamber Orchestra "Fam & Ihrlie"
 Symphony No. 5 for Synthesizer & Orchestra "Ninja Resurrection"
 Symphony No. 6 "Princess Nine"
 Symphony No. 7 "Battle Royale"
 Symphony No. 8 "Sin"
 Symphony No. 9 "Northern Lights at Sea" (also called The Aurora)
 Symphony No. 10 "Battle Royale II"
 Symphony No. 11
 Symphony No. 12 for Wind Orchestra "Gaia"

Orchestra 
 Métamorphosées pour Ka-Den-Syo〈2001〉
 Symphonic Poem "Infinite Space"〈2009〉
 Fanfare pour la Fêtê du 85e.Anniversaire Shobi〈2010〉

Wind Band 
 Expiation "Atonement" (commissioned by Fujimura Girls' Junior and Senior High School Brass Band)〈1999〉
 Radiance and Meditation in Two Parts (Commissioned work for the 2nd Symphonic Band for the 21st Century "Kyoen")〈1999〉
 Bugaku (first performance at Tokyo Metropolitan Nagayama High School)〈1999〉
 Music for imaginary ballet No. 2〈2000〉
 Yu-gyou-chu-kan: Azuma Kagami-ibun (commissioned by Fujimura Girls' Junior and Senior High School Brass Band)〈2000〉
 From Oppression to Liberation〈2000〉
 The Book of Exodus〈2001〉
 Metamorphoses〈2001〉
 Ohonai ～Homage to the Great Hanshin-Awaji Earthquake of January 17, 1995～ (commissioned by the Eastern Area Band of the Ground Self-Defense Force)〈2001〉
 Concerto Grosso for Big Band and Saxophone Quartet〈2002〉
 Una obertura espagnol falsa "El Jardin de los Recuerdos"〈2002〉
 La forme de shaque amour chonge comme le kaleidoscope〈2003〉
 La Suite Éxcentrique (Commissioned work for Saitama Prefectural Yono High School Symphonic Band)〈2003〉
 Fanfare Symphonique (Commissioned work for Fukuoka University Symphonic Band)〈2004〉
 Alas de Hierro - Requiem for the young warriors scattered in the Void (Commissioned work for Kagoshima J.S.B. Symphonic Band)〈2004〉
 Structures II〈2004〉
 Tobiume ni nosete (Commissioned work for the 19th National Cultural Festival Fukuoka, Fukuoka Brass Band Federation)〈2004〉
 Legenda y Regenea Cea〈2004〉
 Kodo: Hometown  (commissioned work for the 30th anniversary of the Akita Wind Orchestra)〈2005〉
– I. Children's Song 
– II. Spring Festival
– III. Drumming
 Chushingura-ibun (commissioned work for the 50th anniversary of NTT East Tokyo Symphonic Band)〈2007〉
 Symphony Suite "Gaia" in 2 movements〈2007〉
 Fantôme de l'Amour〈2007〉
 La Porte d'une Famille (Commissioned work for Toyama Minami Brass Band)〈2008〉
 Capuleti and Montecchi "Romeo and Juliet" - The Love and the Death〈2008〉
 Dream for Tomorrow (Commissioned work for Adachi Municipal No.14 Junior High School Brass Band)〈2009〉
 Concert music (Commissioned work for the 30th Anniversary of Kasuga Municipal Symphonic Band) 〈2009〉
 Adagio Słowiańskie〈2009〉
 Deux Situations (Commissioned work for Soka Gakkai Kansai Symphonic Band)〈2010〉
 Hiroshima Brill El Sol (Commissioned work for Hiroshima General Symphonic Band Association)〈2010〉
 The Fragrance of Flowers: Cherry Blossoms, Laurel Blossoms, Roses〈2011〉
 Enbu Dan Kim Fantasy ~ Azuma Kagami Ibun ~ (Commissioned work for Nagano Prefectural Nagano Nishi High School Brass Band)〈2011〉
 Caprice〈2011〉
 Euscaphis Japonica〈2012〉
 Green ~ Etude for Microtones, Clusters, Sound Density Convergence and Diffusion〈2013〉
 Deuxième Série Harmonique〈2014〉
 Lettres le Néon - Sartre and Beauvoir: Philosophy, Love, and New Form of Love (Commissioned work for Koshigaya Nishi High School Symphonic Band)〈2014〉
 Sandalwood ~ Soundscape for Polytempo, Polytonal, Polyrhythm and Multi-dimensional Micro Ensemble〈2014〉
 Structures III〈2014〉
 Tragiczny sonata na źrebaka i płowe〈2014〉
 Delusion of Heavenly Thunder (Commissioned work for Hamamatsu Symphony Orchestra 40th Anniversary)〈2014〉
 "Shizuku" for Wind Ensemble〈2015〉
 Cinema Chimérique〈2015〉
 And the stillness fades to the woods〈2015〉
 Profondum ~ Underground〈2016〉
 Preludio Espressiva〈2016〉
 Version remix pour la Forme de Chaque Amour Change comme le Kaleidoscope (commissioned by Graal Wind Orchestra)〈2016〉
 Paraphrase par "Statique et Extatique" avec un Prologue et Épilogue〈2016〉
 Amabile (Commissioned work for Toke Civic Wind Orchestra)〈2016〉
 Jeu Chimérique(Commissioned work for Toke Civic Wind Orchestra)〈2016〉
 Hirata Fantasy: Sixteen Islands ~Hirata Festival ~ Inome Cave ~ Hole in the Yellow Springs ~ Nuto-Gotama-Gami (Commissioned work for Hirata Junior High School in Izumo City)〈2016〉
 L'être-pour-autrui〈2017〉
 Endosymbiotic Transformation〈2017〉
 The Girl of Orléans (commissioned by Bunkyo University Symphonic Band) 〈2019〉
 Five Elements of Conflict (Commissioned work for Hamamatsu Symphonic Band) 〈2020〉

Symphonic Suites for Wind Band  
 Morceau par 1e. Suite Symphonique
 Morceau par 2e. Suite Symphonique "GR"
There is also "Train Chase Edition" which is based on the same piece, that is Symphony No.2, but has different composition.
 Morceau par 3e. Suite Symphonique "GR"
 Morceau par 4e. Suite Symphonique "FI"
 Morceau par 5e. Suite Symphonique "NR"
 Morceau par 6e. Suite Symphonique "PN"
 Morceau par 7e. Suite Symphonique "BR"
 Morceau par 8e. Suite Symphonique "SIN"
 Morceau par 9e. Suite Symphonique "Aurora"
 Morceau par 10e. Suite Symphonique "BRII"
 Morceau par 11e. Suite Symphonique "MKII"
 Morceau par 12e. Suite Symphonique "Gaia"
 Symphonic Selections from "GR"
 Symphony Suite "GR" "The Day the Earth Stood Still

Concerto  
 Timpani Concerto
 Euphonium Concerto
 Alto Saxophone Concerto
 Small Concerto for Electric Violin, Electric Guitar & Orchestra
 Trois impressions pour Euphonium et Harmonie 2007
 Ballade pour Saxophone alto 2010
 Concerto for 4 JUNO-STAGE and Wind Orchestra 2011

Chamber music 
 Asōgi (Alto Fl., Shinobue, Violin, Contrabass, Piano, 2 Percussions)
 Autumn Rhyme I - VI (Synthesizer & Vocoder, Harp, Piano, Percussion)
 Ciel d'Automne
 Impromptu
 Aioi Soshiku, Book II (Piccolo, 17-string Koto)
 Structures (Wind Octet & Percussion )
 3e. Ballet Chimérique (Wind Octet and Percussion)
 Battle No. 2 (Saxophone Quintet)
 "Pentagon" for 5 percussionists
 Sonorité et Mouvements (Percussion Quintet)
 And the Stillness Fades to the Woods (Percussion Octet)
 The Rose of Strawberry Fields - Longing for Imagine (Percussion Octet)
 Le Chaos et L'Harmonie (Wind Sextet and percussion)
 Six Angels in the Sky (Flute Sextet)
 Couleur et Movements (Flute Quintet)
 "Tatsumi Tamekaze" for Brass Octet
 Fantastique Elegie (1991)
 Pieśń Drwala i Wiejska Zabawa (1991)
 Vib Letter (1991)
 Kwartet smyczkowy Sur le nom de BACEWICZ et SZYMANOWSKI (1992)
 Fantaja (1994)
 String Quartet No. 1 "Twilight of the Heroes" (1994)
 Florata (1999)
 Dowcip (2001)
 La Forme de Chaque Amour (2002)
 Trois Pieses (2002)
 Kaleidoscope (2002)
 Octagon (2003)
 Quatuor (2003)
 Cori spezzati (2004)
 Deux danses for Clarinet Octet (2004)
 l'Incohérent (2004)
 Thanatos (2005)
 Romance sur le nom de André Henry (2005)
 La marée et l'algue (2005)
 LA (2006)
 Fantaisie de Cantus sur le nom de KANA et REIKO (2006)

Soundtracks

Anime

Game

Movies

References

Citations

Printed Sources

 David G. Hebert (2012). "Wind Bands and Cultural Identity in Japanese Schools". Dordrecht and New York: Springer. 
 David G. Hebert (2008). Alchemy of Brass: Spirituality and Wind Music in Japan. In E. M. Richards & K. Tanosaki (Eds.), Music of Japan Today. Newcastle: Cambridge Scholars Publishing, pp. 236–244.

External links
 Phoenix Entertainment 
 Interview with Amano @ http://www.sakigake-adb.co.jp 
 
 

1957 births
Anime composers
Concert band composers
Japanese classical composers
Japanese film score composers
Japanese male classical composers
Japanese male film score composers
Living people
Musicians from Akita Prefecture
People from Akita (city)